University Center or University Centre may refer to:

United States

University Center (Mercer University), Georgia, a multi-purpose facility
University Center (Southeastern Louisiana), a multi-purpose facility in Hammond, Louisiana
University Center/Baltimore Street (Baltimore Light Rail station), a transit station in Baltimore, Maryland
University Center, Michigan, a locale in Bay and Saginaw counties
University Center Rochester, Minnesota, a higher education facility
University Center (The New School), New York City, New York

Norway
University Centre in Svalbard, a company that provides university-level education in Arctic studies